The Los Angeles Lakers are an American professional basketball team based in Los Angeles, California, formerly known as the Minneapolis Lakers from 1948 to 1960. They play in the Pacific Division of the Western Conference in the National Basketball Association (NBA). The Lakers have played their home games at the Staples Center since 1999. The franchise took its official name from Minnesota's nickname, the Land of 10,000 Lakes. At the time the name was revealed, the Lakers were in Minneapolis. In their franchise history, the team has only missed the NBA playoffs 11 times. According to Forbes magazine, the Lakers are the second most valuable basketball franchise in the NBA, valued at approximately US$4.4 billion, surpassed only by the New York Knicks. The Lakers are majority-owned by Jerry Buss's family trust, while Rob Pelinka is the general manager.

There have been 26 head coaches for the Lakers since joining the NBA. The franchise's first head coach while in the NBA was John Kundla, who coached for 11 seasons with the Lakers. The Lakers won four additional NBA championships in the next five years under Kundla. Phil Jackson is the franchise's all-time leader for the most regular-season games coached (902), most playoff games coached (181), most regular-season game wins (610), and most playoff wins (118). The Lakers have won 17 championships; five with Kundla, five with Jackson, four with Riley, one with Bill Sharman, one with Paul Westhead, and one with Frank Vogel. Kundla, Sharman, Riley, and Jackson have been inducted into the Basketball Hall of Fame as a coach. George Mikan, Jim Pollard, Jerry West, Pat Riley, Magic Johnson, Kurt Rambis, Byron Scott, and Luke Walton have all played and coached for the Lakers. Darvin Ham is the current head coach.

Key

Coaches
Note: Statistics are correct through the 2021–22 season.

Notes
 A running total of the number of coaches of the Lakers. Thus, any coach who has two or more separate terms as head coach is only counted once.
 Each year is linked to an article about that particular NBA season.

References
General

Specific

Lists of National Basketball Association head coaches by team

Head coaches